Anachis avaroides is a species of sea snail in the family Columbellidae, the dove snails.

References

 Nordsieck F. (1975). Conchiglie delle Isole Canarie. Parte 2.. La Conchiglia 75–76: 3–7, 22
 Gofas, S.; Le Renard, J.; Bouchet, P. (2001). Mollusca. in: Costello, M.J. et al. (eds), European Register of Marine Species: a check-list of the marine species in Europe and a bibliography of guides to their identification. Patrimoines Naturels. 50: 180–213.
 Ávila, S.P.; Cardigos, F.; Santos, R.S. (2004). D. João de Castro Bank, a shallow water hydrothermal-vent in the Azores: checklist of marine Molluscs. Arquipélago (Ciénc. Biol. Mar./Life Mar. Sci.) 21A: 75–80
 Monsecour, K. (2010). Checklist of Columbellidae. pers. comm.

avaroides
Gastropods described in 1975